Henry Louis Gibson (1906–1992) was a British-born American pioneering medical photographer. He was born in Truro, Cornwall, England, United Kingdom and died in Rochester, New York State, United States of America.

Career
Gibson was for many years editor and consultant in medical, biological, scientific, and technical photography for the Eastman Kodak Company. He received his B.Sc. degree in physics from the University of Illinois. He was a president of the Biological Photographic Association (renamed the Biocommunications Association). He was made a Fellow of the association and in 1960 received its highest honor, the Louis Schmidt Award for his outstanding contribution to scientific photography.

He was an expert in medical uses of infrared radiation and had pioneered its use in detecting breast cancer.

Publications
The Photography of Patients (1952)
Copying and Duplicating Medical Subjects and Radiographs (1953)
Perfecting your Enlarging (1961) Chilton Co., Book Division
Light through the Lens (1968) Christopher Pub. House
Close-up Photography and Photomacrography (1969) Eastman Kodak Co., Professional and Finishing Markets Division
Stars through the Apple Tree (1972) Christopher Pub. House
Medical Photography; clinical-ultraviolet-infrared (1973) Eastman Kodak Co., Professional and Finishing Markets Division
Photography by Infrared (1978), Wiley
The Biological Photographic Association, its Half Century (1981), Biological Photographic Association, Inc.

See also

Medical imaging

Notes

External links
Pioneers of Invisible Radiation Photography: Lou Gibson
The Infrared Photography Book List

1906 births
1992 deaths
People from Truro
Medical photographers
20th-century American photographers
British emigrants to the United States